Pilar Juliana Schramm Cayetano (born March 22, 1966), known as Pia Cayetano, is a Filipina politician and lawyer serving as a Senator since 2019, a position she previously held from 2004 to 2016. She was also the Representative of Taguig's 2nd district from 2016 to 2019 and was one of the Deputy Speakers.

Cayetano was born to a political family currently based in Taguig. Her father was the late former senator Rene Cayetano; her younger brother, Alan Peter, is an incumbent senator who formerly represented Taguig-Pateros district and became Speaker of the House during the 18th Congress; another younger brother, Rene Carl, is a former councilor of Muntinlupa; her youngest brother, Lino, was mayor of Taguig; and her sister-in-law (Alan Peter's wife) Lani, is the incumbent mayor of Taguig.

Cayetano authored the Expanded Senior Citizens Act, Expanded Breastfeeding Promoting Act, and the Responsible Parenthood and Reproductive Health Act of 2012, among others. She earned her economics (cum laude) and law degrees at the University of the Philippines, where she played volleyball for the UP Lady Maroons team that won the 1983 UAAP title. She has also played for the national women's volleyball team. Cayetano is also a runner, cyclist, and triathlete.

Pia Cayetano was conferred the Rizal Women of Malalos Award by the Order of the Knights of Rizal.

Early life
Cayetano was born on March 22, 1966, to Renato "Compañero" Cayetano, who would later become Senator, and German-American former school teacher Sandra Schramm.

Education
Cayetano took up Bachelor of Arts in Economics at the University of the Philippines, and graduated cum laude in 1985. She then took up Bachelor of Laws at University of the Philippines Diliman. She graduated in 1991 with academic distinction, #7 in her class. She also became a member of the Honor Society, Order of the Purple Feather.

Legal career

From 1992 to 1995, Cayetano was an associate lawyer at the Castillo, Laman Tan, and Pantaleon Law Offices, specializing in corporate and intellectual property law. From 1996 to 1999, she was an officer for the legal and corporate affairs of the Belle Corporation and its affiliates, including the gaming conglomerate BW Resources. In 2000, she was general counsel for the Philweb Corporation. In 2001, she was appointed chairwoman of the Maxi Group of Companies, a retailer and distributor of educational toys, infant apparel and accessories.

In 2012, she opened her own cafe, Slice, at Bonifacio High Street in Taguig.

Political career
Following the death of her father, then Senator Renato Cayetano, due to liver cancer on June 25, 2003, several legislators including senators, encouraged Pia Cayetano to run for office. As a result, she ran for a Senate seat in the 2004 elections. Initially she was a virtual unknown to the electorate but with the liberalization of political advertisements, she gained popularity with her TV advertisement as a runner, cyclist, and as a tri-athlete, and as a new host of her father's TV program Compañero y Compañera for a short stint. She won in the elections landing in the sixth position. In 2010, Cayetano ran for re-election as a guest candidate under the Nacionalista Party. She won, again landing in sixth place. Her second term as senator ended in 2016.

During 112th Inter-Parliamentary Union Assembly in Manila, Cayetano was elected President of the 10th Meeting of Women Parliamentarians during the sidelines of the annual meeting. On April 17, 2008, she was elected for a two-year term, president of the Committee of Women Parliamentarians of the Inter-Parliamentary Union (IPU) during its 118th General Assembly in Cape Town, South Africa. As the first Filipino and Asian to head it, she ran unopposed and took over from Uruguay's Monica Xavier. This is the highest position held by any Filipino or Asian in the history of the IPU.

Cayetano pushed for the enactment of the ‘Magna Carta of Women’ which seeks to end all forms of gender discrimination, and the ‘Expanded Breastfeeding Act,’ which establishes lactation stations in the workplace to encourage nursing mothers to continue breastfeeding even at work.

Cayetano is likewise credited for the passage of the ‘Expanded Senior Citizens Act’ which allowed the elderly to fully enjoy the 20-percent senior citizens discount by exempting their purchases of medicines and other vital services from the 12-percent Value Added Tax.

She was responsible for passing the ‘Food and Drugs Administration (FDA) Law’ and the ‘Universally Accessible Cheaper and Quality Medicines Law,’ both of which seek to strengthen State mechanisms to ensure safe and affordable quality drugs for all. She also authored or co-authored the Foster Care Act (RA 10165), Mandatory Infants and Children Health Immunization Act (RA 10152), Expanded Breastfeeding Promotion Act (RA 10028), Establishment of Persons with Disability Affairs Office Act (RA 10070), National Anti-Rabies Act (RA 9482), and the Environmental Awareness and Education Act (RA 9512), among others.

Most recently, Senator Cayetano worked for the passage of two landmark laws, the Reproductive Health Act (RA 10354), for which she was the principal sponsor, and the Sin Tax Reform Act (RA 10351) which sought to fund government health programs from tax proceeds from cigarettes and alcohol products.

In 2016, she won as Congresswoman of Taguig City's second district. She would later be named one of twelve Deputy Speakers of the House of Representatives under the 17th Congress.

In 2019, she ran for a comeback to the Senate under the Hugpong ng Pagbabago coalition. She was successful, placing fourth and thus securing her third term.

Personal life

Cayetano is an advocate of sports as part of a holistic youth development program, prevention of diseases, and the need for a healthy and fit lifestyle. She is the founder of Gabriel Symphony Foundation which was established following the death of her son Gabriel, who was diagnosed with multiple congenital anomalies. The foundation helps children with disabilities and life-threatening ailments.

She has three siblings: Alan Peter, incumbent congressman of Taguig who formerly served as Senator, Secretary of Foreign Affairs, and Speaker of the House of Representatives; Rene Carl, a former councilor of Muntinlupa and the owner of the collectible figurine store "Maxicollector"; and Lino Edgardo, a television and movie director, former Barangay Chairman of Barangay Fort Bonifacio in Taguig, former congressional representative of the second district of Taguig, and former Mayor of Taguig. Cayetano is a mother to two daughters, Maxine and Nadine, and a son Gabriel, who died from complications of a rare chromosomal disorder in 2001. She is also a foster parent to Rene Lucas.

She is also the founder of the Compañero Rene Cayetano Foundation in memory of her father, which helps the underprivileged in the areas of health, education, and environment, as well as Pinay In Action (PIA), which promotes health, fitness, and women empowerment.

She is a member of Young Entrepreneurs' Organization and a spokesperson of the Philippine Cancer Society and the Universal Birth Registration Project.

References

External links
Official website 
Senator Pia S. Cayetano - Senate of the Philippines

1966 births
Living people
21st-century Filipino women politicians
21st-century Filipino politicians
Pia
Deputy Speakers of the House of Representatives of the Philippines
Filipino female triathletes
20th-century Filipino lawyers
Filipino people of American descent
Filipino people of German descent
Filipino women lawyers
Filipino women's volleyball players
Lakas–CMD (1991) politicians
Lakas–CMD politicians
Members of the House of Representatives of the Philippines from Taguig
Nacionalista Party politicians
People from Taguig
Politicians from Metro Manila
Senators of the 13th Congress of the Philippines
Senators of the 14th Congress of the Philippines
Senators of the 15th Congress of the Philippines
Senators of the 16th Congress of the Philippines
Senators of the 18th Congress of the Philippines
Sportspeople from Metro Manila
University Athletic Association of the Philippines volleyball players
University of the Philippines Diliman alumni
Women members of the House of Representatives of the Philippines
Women members of the Senate of the Philippines
People who renounced United States citizenship
Senators of the 19th Congress of the Philippines